Antonio Cardarelli (29 March 1831, Civitanova del Sannio – 8 January 1927) was an Italian physician remembered for describing Cardarelli's sign.

Biography 
Antonio Cardarelli trained at the Collegio Medico di San Aniello of the University of Naples, graduating with a doctorate in 1853. He worked at the Ospedale degli Incurabili, becoming professor of medical pathology in 1890 and then professor of clinical medicine. In addition to his eponymous sign, the Ospedale Antonio Cardarelli and the Via Antonio Cardarelli in Naples are also named after him.

References 

Italian pathologists
1831 births
1927 deaths
People from the Province of Isernia
Deputies of Legislature XIV of the Kingdom of Italy
Deputies of Legislature XV of the Kingdom of Italy
Deputies of Legislature XVI of the Kingdom of Italy
Deputies of Legislature XVII of the Kingdom of Italy
Deputies of Legislature XVIII of the Kingdom of Italy
Members of the Senate of the Kingdom of Italy